Monte Carlo Baby is a 1951 comedy film co-directed by Jean Boyer and Lester Fuller. It featured an early performance by Audrey Hepburn playing a spoiled actress. Most Hepburn biographies indicate that it was during the filming of this film that Hepburn was first discovered by the playwright Colette and chosen for the lead role in the play Gigi, which would lead to Hepburn launching her acting career in Hollywood (though see Secret People (film) for an alternative account that suggests she was discovered by a film producer via that movie). In any event, this was the last movie Hepburn made before launching her Hollywood film career.

Monte Carlo Baby was produced in the English language, while a second version of the film was made in French. Since Hepburn was fluent in French, she played the same role (although the character's name was changed). This version of the film was released in 1951 as Nous irons à Monte Carlo (We're Going to Monte Carlo).

Cast

External links
 
 

1951 films
1951 comedy films
1950s English-language films
1950s multilingual films
British black-and-white films
British comedy films
British multilingual films
English-language French films
Films set in Monaco
French black-and-white films
French comedy films
French multilingual films
1950s French-language films
Films directed by Jean Boyer
1950s British films
1950s French films